William Bruce Gingell (1819–1899) was an architect practising in Bristol.

He was in partnership with John Henry Hirst for a time and was influential in the Bristol Byzantine architectural style.

Significant buildings 
 Gardiners warehouse
 Lloyds Bank, Bristol
 Robinson's Warehouse, Bristol
 Warehouse premises of Hardware (Bristol) Limited
 Moorlands House, Leeds
 Midland Bank, 55 Cardiff Street, Aberdare, 1857

References

External links

William Bruce Gingell family tree

19th-century English architects
Architects from Bristol
1819 births
1899 deaths